Oscar Theander Harstad (May 24, 1892 – November 14, 1985) was an American Major League Baseball pitcher who appeared in 32 games for the Cleveland Indians during the 1915 Cleveland Indians season. After his baseball career, "Theander" as he was called by his family and friends, became a dentist serving the Milton-Freewater, Oregon, community for over 50 years.

He was born in Parkland, Washington, and died in Corvallis, Oregon, at age 93. He was the son of Bjug Harstad, founder of Pacific Lutheran University. He was buried at Oaklawn Cemetery in Corvallis.

References

External links

Article about Harstad's daughter from Oregon State University Alumni Association

1892 births
1985 deaths
American dentists
Baseball players from Oregon
Baseball players from Washington (state)
Cleveland Indians players
Major League Baseball pitchers
Norfolk Mary Janes players
People from Milton-Freewater, Oregon
People from Parkland, Washington
Portland Beavers players
Regina Senators players
Spokane Indians players
Vancouver Beavers players